See for Miles Records (SFM) was a British record label which was one of the first British re-issue specialists predating the emergence of compact discs.

See for Miles reissued most of the records of many labels including Dandelion Records on CD in the 1990s. The name hints both to its co-owner Colin Miles and The Who's "I Can See for Miles". Miles worked for his SFM partner Mark Rye at EMI on their re-issue programme, and they reunited after Miles had established the label upon leaving EMI. The company went into administration and in 2007 the label rights were sold to Phoenix Music International. Rye then went on to form Pucka Records, GVC Records and the RockHistory.co.uk project as well as continuing the Magpie Direct mail order company that he had created whilst at See For Miles.

See also 
List of record labels

External links

British record labels
Reissue record labels